El Music Group is an American independent record label created by the rock band Collective Soul. After departing from Atlantic Records in 2001, the band set this label up to release all its future albums.

The first album released by Collective Soul on the label was the band's sixth studio album, Youth, in 2004. Beyond that two compilation releases, 2005s From the Ground Up and 2006s Home (a [live album recorded with the Atlanta Symphony Youth Orchestra in April 2005), were released before the band announced their seventh studio album in the summer of 2007.

Afterwords was the first album released by the band under an exclusive physical format (CD) deal with Target Stores.

See also
 List of record labels

References

External links
Official site (dead, parking page)

American independent record labels
Collective Soul
Indie rock record labels
Record labels established in 2004